Suman Patil is an Indian politician and sits as a member of the Maharashtra Legislative Assembly. She was elected in place of her late husband RR Patil and won by a record number of votes.

Personal life 
Suman Patil was the wife of RR Patil an Indian politician from the state of Maharashtra.He died on 16 February 2015 (aged 57).

They had three children Smita, Supriya & Rohit .

Positions held
Member of the Maharashtra Legislative Assembly

References 

People from Maharashtra
Marathi politicians
Members of the Maharashtra Legislative Assembly
Nationalist Congress Party politicians from Maharashtra
People from Sangli district
Indian Hindus
Living people
Year of birth missing (living people)